Rohr is a municipality in the district of Roth, in Bavaria, Germany.

References

Roth (district)